Echeveria secunda, called the glaucous echeveria, is a species of succulent flowering plant in the genus Echeveria, native to Mexico, and introduced to the Dominican Republic, New Zealand, and Vietnam. Its cultivar 'Compton Carousel' has gained the Royal Horticultural Society's Award of Garden Merit.

References

secunda
Succulent plants
Endemic flora of Mexico
Plants described in 1838